Moreland is a town in Coweta County, Georgia, United States. As of the 2020 census, the town population was 382.

The author Erskine Caldwell was born in Moreland in 1903. Newspaper columnist Lewis Grizzard grew up in the town.

History

The town of Moreland traces back to the community of the Mt. Zion Methodist Church.  This church was built in 1843 for the farmers who had mostly come to this area as part of the Georgia Land Lottery of 1827. Upon the arrival of the Atlanta and West Point Railroad in 1852, the center of this community shifted southward. It had a wood and water stop for trains and was called Puckett Station.
 
The construction of a train station in 1888 was the event that led to the formation of the present town. The community was renamed Moreland on September 1, 1888 and incorporated on December 28, 1888. The town was laid out with the train station at its center and the boundaries extending one half mile in every direction to form a circular shape.

In the early days of Moreland, cotton was the most important contributor to the local economy.  Fruit crops were also a factor including peaches, plums, pears, and grapes. An economic shift occurred during the 1920s after the devastation of the cotton crop by the boll weevil.  Diseases and bad weather eventually wiped out the commercial peach orchards.

W.A. Brannon opened a store in 1894 and later other business ventures. Hard economic times forced him out of business and his buildings were sold in 1920. The Moreland Hosiery Mill was located in these buildings for several years. In 1926, new investors bought this property and opened Moreland Knitting Mills. This was the town’s major industrial employer until the business  closed in 1968.

Eventually these buildings were donated to the town of Moreland and are now used to house town offices, public meeting spaces, and the Hometown Heritage Museum. Memorabilia that was once displayed in the Lewis Grizzard Museum in an old service station was moved to the historic Moreland Mill on Main St. in 2011.

Geography
U.S. Route 29 passes through the town, leading north  to Newnan, the county seat, and southwest  to Grantville. U.S. Route 27A leads north with US-29 to Newnan and south  to Luthersville.

Demographics

As of the census of 2000, there were 393 people, 150 households, and 109 families residing in the town. The racial makeup of the town was 85.24% White, 14.50% African American, and 0.25% from two or more races. Hispanic or Latino of any race were 1.02% of the population.

There were 150 households, out of which 33.3% had children under the age of 18 living with them, 52.0% were married couples living together, 14.7% had a female householder with no husband present, and 27.3% were non-families. 24.0% of all households were made up of individuals, and 12.7% had someone living alone who was 65 years of age or older.  The average household size was 2.62 and the average family size was 3.12.

In the town, the population was spread out, with 24.7% under the age of 18, 9.4% from 18 to 24, 28.8% from 25 to 44, 21.9% from 45 to 64, and 15.3% who were 65 years of age or older.  The median age was 37 years. For every 100 females, there were 95.5 males.  For every 100 females age 18 and over, there were 87.3 males.

The median income for a household in the town was $45,375, and the median income for a family was $58,000. Males had a median income of $32,500 versus $31,042 for females. The per capita income for the town was $17,846.  About 8.2% of families and 9.4% of the population were below the poverty line, including 14.0% of those under age 18 and 7.8% of those age 65 or over.

Notable people
 Erskine Caldwell
 Lewis Grizzard
 Mattiline Render

References

Towns in Coweta County, Georgia
Towns in Georgia (U.S. state)